Henry Luttrell may refer to:

 Henry Luttrell (Jacobite commander) (–1717), Jacobite commander in Ireland who joined the Williamites after Limerick
 Henry Fownes Luttrell (died 1780) (–1780) of Dunster Castle, High Sheriff of Somerset 1754–55, Member of Parliament (MP) for Minehead 1768–74
 Henry Luttrell, 2nd Earl of Carhampton (1743–1821), grandson of the Jacobite, opponent of John Wilkes
 Henry Luttrell (wit) (–1851), wit and poet, illegitimate son of the 2nd Earl of Carhampton
 Henry Fownes Luttrell (1790–1867), MP for Minehead 1816–22